Li-Ning Star Cycling Team is a UCI Continental team founded in 2020, that is based in Beijing, China.

Team roster

References

External links

UCI Continental Teams (Asia)
Cycling teams based in China
Cycling teams established in 2020